Harry M. Leonard (June 22, 1900 – December 17, 1985) was an American sound mixer who had just under 300 film credits, including films such as The Day the Earth Stood Still and Laura.

He was nominated at the 18th Academy Awards for Best Special Effects, for the film Captain Eddie. His nomination was shared with Fred Sersen, Roger Heman Sr. and Sol Halperin.

References

External links

1900 births
1985 deaths
Musicians from Scranton, Pennsylvania